Tell Jadid  is a Syrian village located in Barri Sharqi Subdistrict in Salamiyah District, Hama. According to the Syria Central Bureau of Statistics (CBS), Tell Jadid had a population of 1,230 in the 2004 census. Its inhabitants predominantly Alawite and Ismaili Muslims, but there is also a sizable Sunni Muslim Bedouin community.

References 

Alawite communities in Syria
Ismaili communities in Syria
Populated places in Salamiyah District